Isaac Davis White (March 6, 1901 – June 11, 1990) was a senior officer in the United States Army who commanded the U.S. Army, Pacific (USARPAC) from July 1957 to March 1961. He was commissioned in the cavalry in 1923 and went on to serve in World War II and the Korean War. Because of his extensive experience in tank warfare, at his retirement Armor magazine dubbed him "Mr. Armor".

Education
White graduated with a Bachelor of Science degree from Norwich University in 1922. His professional military education included the Cavalry School Troop Officer's Course (1928), United States Army Command and General Staff College (1939), and National War College (1948).

In 1951, White received the honorary degree of Master of Military Science from Norwich University. In 1957, Norwich awarded White an honorary LL.D. In 1958, the University of Maryland, College Park awarded him an honorary Doctor of Military Science.

Military career

Most of White's career was spent as a troop commander. His major commands include Commanding General of the 2nd Armored Division in Europe, 1945, and Commanding General of the United States Constabulary for the European Command. In the latter stages of the Korean War, he served as Commanding General of X Corps, followed by Commanding General of the Fourth Army in Fort Sam Houston, Texas. Prior to becoming Commanding General for the US Army, Pacific, White served as Commanding General for the Eighth Army in Korea.

Additional assignments include Commandant of the Cavalry School and Commandant for the Ground General School in Fort Riley, Kansas. He later served as Deputy Commanding General for the Seventh Army and Chief of Staff for First Army Headquarters, Governors Island, New York. He also served as Commandant of the Armored School. After retirement, White received recognition as a visionary, strategic military thinker with the publication of his book, Alternative to Armageddon—the Peace Potential of Lightning War. Published in 1970, he advocated a quick strike capability for US forces as an alternative to a nuclear exchange or a war of attrition, as the nation was experiencing in Vietnam at the time.

Awards and decorations
White's awards include the Army Distinguished Service Medal with two oak leaf clusters, the Silver Star with oak leaf cluster, the Legion of Merit with two oak leaf clusters, the Bronze Star Medal, the World War II Victory Medal, the Korean Service Medal with three Bronze Service Stars, and multiple decorations from other nations including Korea, France, Belgium, Philippines, Russia, Mexico, and Japan.

U.S. Route 202, from White's birthplace of Peterborough, New Hampshire, through Jaffrey to the Massachusetts border in Rindge, has been designated the "General I.D. White Highway" in his honor.

References

External links

Papers of Isaac D. White, Dwight D. Eisenhower Presidential Library
 usarpac.army.mil: Isaac D. White
Generals of World War II

1901 births
1990 deaths
National War College alumni
United States Army Command and General Staff College alumni
United States Army generals
United States Army personnel of the Korean War
Recipients of the Legion of Merit
Recipients of the Distinguished Service Medal (US Army)
Recipients of the Silver Star
Norwich University alumni
People from Peterborough, New Hampshire
Military personnel from New Hampshire
United States Army generals of World War II
Naval War College alumni